Pediatric Nursing is a peer-reviewed nursing journal published bimonthly by Jannetti Publications, Inc. Its focus is professional pediatric nursing in clinical practice, education, research, and administration. The editor in chief is Judy A. Rollins. The journal sponsors the Annual Pediatric Nursing Conference.

See also
 List of nursing journals

References

External links 
 

Pediatric nursing journals
Bimonthly journals
English-language journals